Jonathan Wolff may refer to:

Jonathan Wolff (philosopher) (born 1959), British political philosopher
Jonathan Wolff (musician) (born 1958), American composer of the Seinfeld TV theme

See also
Jon A. Wolff (1956–2020), American geneticist
John Wolff (1906–2005), American legal scholar
Jonathan Wolfe (Robotech), fictional character
Jonathan Wolfe, former bassist with Falling in Reverse